Parallactis is a genus of moth in the family Autostichidae.

Species
 Parallactis mitigata (Meyrick, 1914)
 Parallactis ochrobyrsa (Meyrick, 1921)
 Parallactis panchlora (Meyrick, 1911)
 Parallactis periochra (Meyrick, 1916)
 Parallactis plaesiodes (Meyrick, 1920)
 Parallactis zorophanes Janse, 1954

References

 
Autostichinae